Beau Lotto is a Professor of Neuroscience and author. He is a professor at University of London, as well as a visiting scholar at New York University. His research explores how the brain adapts to uncertainty at the cellular, computational and perceptual levels with the aim of understanding the fundamental principles of biologically-inspired innovation.

Early life and education
Lotto was born in Seattle and earned his bachelor's degree in anatomy and physiology at the University of California, Berkeley in 1991. He then moved to Scotland, where he earned his PhD in Cellular and Molecular Developmental Neuroscience from University Medical School, Edinburgh in 1994. He remained in Edinburgh for his first Postdoctoral Fellowship (with Professor David Price), and then moved to Duke University for his second Fellowship, where he was mentored by Professor Dale Purves.

Career
He was a Lecturer and then Reader at University College London, and is now a Professor at University of London, as well as a visiting scholar at New York University. He has mentored Undergraduate, Masters and PhD students, as well as Postdoctoral fellows. Beau and his lab have published over 70 peer reviewed articles across multiple disciplines including human perception, neuroelectrophysiology, molecular and cellular brain development, bumblebee visual behaviour, digital music, graph theory, complex systems theory, computational evolution, artificial intelligence, architecture, theatre and design. While at the Institute of Ophthalmology, his lab created the first app for the blind that was available on the app store. His lab has received funding from a wide range of institutions including the Wellcome Trust, the Leverhulme Trust, the BBSRC, EPSCR and MRC.

In 2001, he founded The Lab of Misfits LLC, a neuroperception creative studio. Lab of Misfits has held a two-year residency at London's Science Museum, where it became one of the UK's first ‘open labs,’ where anyone from the public could conduct real science. The Lab creates 'Experiential Experiments’ that engage the public for partnered organizations including Cirque du Soleil, L’Oreal and Asurion.

The Lab of Misfits, in collaboration with educator David Strudwick, also created the science education programme called , which uses science to teach children from ages 6 to 16 years old Compassion, Creativity, Choice, Community and Courage. The program resulted in the world's youngest peer reviewed scientist at 8 and 10-years-old, and the - then - youngest mainstage TED speaker at 12-years -old when Amy joined Beau on stage.

Lotto is also CEO and Founder of the augmented reality company Ripple Inc., which holds five patents in Augmented Reality (AR), with two further patents pending. Ripple has produced GPS-based AR apps in the industry, including Traces and Frienji.

In addition to three mainstage TED talks, Lotto has spoken at the G8, Google's Zeitgeist, Wired, Davos, Canne Lions Creativity Festival, Burning Man and the Oslo Freedom Forum. He has contributed to television, radio and podcast programs by the BBC, National Geographic*, HBO, Wharton on Business Radio,* and PBS. He is a frequent keynote speaker at major corporations including J&J, Warner Music, Universal, Viacom, Sainsburys, Microsoft, Google, Apple, where he speaks about the fundamental barriers to thriving in uncertainty and how to overcome them.

Honors
He received the Josef Albers Prize for ‘Disruptive Innovation’ at the Tribeca Film Festival in New York, and was the first Creator in Residence at Viacom.

Books

Lotto, Beau. Deviate: The Science of Seeing Differently. New York: Hachette Books
Purves, Dale and Lotto, Beau. Why We See the Way We Do: An Empirical Theory of Vision. Sunderland, MA: Sinauer Associates.

Selected publications

Bergstrom I, Lotto RB Code Bending: A New Creative Coding Practice 2014/10/31 MIT Press The MIT Press, 1 Rogers Street, Cambridge MA 02142-1209 USA journals-info@ mit. Edu (2014).
Bergstrom I, Lotto RB Soma: Live musical performance where congruent visual, auditory, and proprioceptive stimuli fuse to form a combined aesthetic narrative 2014/8/26 MIT Press The MIT Press, 1 Rogers Street, Cambridge MA 02142-1209 USA journals-info@ mit. Edu (2014).
Moutsiana C, Garrett N, Clarke RC, Lotto RB, Blakemore SJ, Sharot T. Proc Natl Acad Sci U S A. 2013 Oct 8;110(41):16396-401. doi: 10.1073/pnas.1305631110. Epub 2013 Sep 9. (2013).
Tibber MS, Manasseh GS, Clarke RC, Gagin G, Swanbeck SN, Butterworth B, Lotto RB, Dakin SC. Vision Res. 2013 Aug 30;89:1-9. doi: 10.1016/j.visres.2013.06.006. Epub 2013 Jun 29. (2013).
Corney, D, Haynes, J, Rees, G, & Lotto, RB : The Brightness of Colour. PLoS ONE(2009).
Clarke, R., and Lotto, R.B. (2009) Visual processing of the bee innately encodes higher-order image statistics when the information is consistent with natural ecology. Vision Research. 49(11):1455-64.
Corney, D. and Lotto, R.B. (2007) From the cover: What are lightness illusions and why do we see them? Public Library of Science Computational Biology 3:e180.
Lotto, R.B. and Wicklein, M. (2005) Bees encode behaviourally significant spectral relationships in complex scenes to resolve stimulus ambiguity. Proceedings of the National Academy of Sciences USA 102:16870-16874.
Lotto, R.B. and Chittka, L. (2005) Seeing the light: Illumination as a contextual cue to color choice behavior in bumblebees. Proceedings of the National Academy of Sciences, USA 102:3852-3856.
Haynes, J., Lotto, R. B. and Rees, G. (2004) Responses of human visual cortex to uniform surfaces measured with fMRI. Proceedings of the National Academy of Sciences USA 101:4286-4291.
Andrews, T. and Lotto, R.B. (2004) Perceptual rivalry is contingent on the perceptual meaning of stimuli. Current Biology. 14:418-423.
Lotto, R.B. (2004) Visual development: Experience puts the colour in life. Current Biology 14: pp. R619-R621.
Lotto, R.B. and Purves, D. (2002) From the cover: A rationale for the structure of colour space.  Trends in Neuroscience 25:82-86.
Lotto, R.B. and Purves, D.  (2001) From the cover: An empirical explanation of the Chubb illusion. Journal of Cognitive Neuroscience 13:547-555.
Lotto, R.B. and Purves, D. (2000) From the cover: An empirical explanation of color contrast. Proceedings of the National Academy of Sciences USA 97:12834-12839.

Public Art Installations

Beau (with Mark Lythgoe and Mark Miodownick) were the first scientists to exhibit at the Hayward Gallery on the South Bank in London when they were asked to take part in the Dan Flavin Retrospective. His illusions, created with Dale Purves, have been exhibited in 30 science museums around the world, and published in multiple books on illusions. His work has been included in arts events at the Serpentine Gallery in London, the Queen Elizabeth Hall, as well as a solo show at the Wellcome Trust Collection. He currently has a live public art installation at ‘Silicon Roundabout’ on Old Street in London called Ommatidium commissioned by Transport for London.

References

External links
 Beau Lotto at TED
 Official website
 Lab of Misfits website

Living people
British male writers
University of California, Berkeley alumni
New York University faculty
Year of birth missing (living people)